"Strip Polka" is a 1942 novelty song with music and lyrics by Johnny Mercer. The music incorporates a polka beat; the lyrics are about Queenie, a burlesque performer who longs to quit her job and retire to life on a farm.

Its use in the film Navy Blues (1941) was prevented as a result of Joseph Breen's memo to Jack Warner regarding the low moral tone of the lyrics.

The first recording of "Strip Polka", which featured the vocals of Mercer, Phil Silvers, and Margaret Whiting, with piano by Jimmy Van Heusen, and an arrangement by Paul Weston, was a significant early hit (charting at #7) for Capitol Records, selling more than a million copies.

The recording by The Andrews Sisters came in at #2 on Variety's list of bestselling songs despite censors only allowing the song to play on the radio for nine or ten weeks.A version by Alvino Rey was popular.

The song was popular with U.S. troops during World War II.

Recordings 

 Johnny Mercer with Phil Silvers, Margaret Whiting, and Jimmy Van Heusen (Capitol, 1942)
 Kay Kyser with vocals by Jack Martin (Columbia, 1942)
 The Andrews Sisters (Decca, 1942)
 Alvino Rey with vocals by The Four King Sisters (Bluebird, 1942)

In other media 
 Elke Sommer on The Dean Martin Show in 1969.
 In Faces (1968)
 Island at War episode "Unusual Successes"

References 

1942 songs
Novelty songs
Songs written by Johnny Mercer
The Andrews Sisters songs
Johnny Mercer songs